Sheppard West (formerly Downsview) is a subway station on Line 1 Yonge–University in Toronto, Ontario, Canada. The station, which is located at the southeast corner of Sheppard Avenue West–Allen Road intersection, opened in 1996 in what was then the City of North York, and the large commuter parking lot, accessible via Allen Road and Sheppard Avenue, opened in July 2005. It was the northern terminus of the western branch of the line until the opening of the six stations of the line's extension north to the City of Vaughan's new downtown core on December 17, 2017.

When this station opened, it was among the first accessible stations of the Toronto subway system, and the first to be purpose-built as such. The station also features Wi-Fi service.

History
Sheppard West station (then named Downsview) was opened in 1996 as a one-stop "Spadina line" (as the northern section of the University branch of Line 1 was then called) extension north from Wilson station. The reason for such a short extension was that the provincial government was offering funds for subway expansion as part of the Network 2011 plan, but was debating whether the extension should form a link between the Spadina line and a future phase of the proposed Sheppard Line (which was only approved with a western terminus at the-then Sheppard station on the Yonge line), or continue further north, either to York University or as part of a loop to join the Spadina and Yonge line branches along the hydro corridor north of Finch Avenue. As an eventual Spadina line extension was later contemplated in any case, the short extension was built with the station constructed on a north–south alignment which favoured a further northward extension.

Downsview was the northwestern terminus of the Yonge–University line for nearly twenty-two years and a major hub for TTC and Viva bus service. On December 17, 2017, the Toronto–York Spadina Subway Extension (TYSSE) north to Vaughan Metropolitan Centre station opened. On May 7 of that year, the station's name was changed from Downsview to Sheppard West in preparation for the opening of the TYSSE and to avoid confusion with the new Downsview Park station. After the extension opened, the station became a through station, with a number of bus routes rerouted to terminate at stations further north.

Construction of an access track to Wilson Yard branching off the mainline south of station began in 2009 but was mothballed after a tunnel was completed in 2010. Track was not laid and the tunnel was sealed off with hoarding. However, the tunnel was put into service in 2018 after completion of an ongoing expansion project to expand the Wilson Yard.

Concurrent with the opening of the TYSSE on December 17, 2017, this station became one of the first eight stations to discontinue sales of legacy TTC fare media (tokens and tickets), previously available at a fare collector booth. Presto vending machines were available to sell Presto cards and to load funds onto them. On May 3, 2019, this station became one of the first ten stations to sell Presto tickets via Presto vending machines.

Name
"Sheppard West" was proposed as the station's new name in 2010 and was approved on September 28, 2012. The name change cost $800,000, most of which was to cover the cost of the already-necessary reconfiguration of the Toronto Rocket subway train fleet's automated "next station" announcement system and destination signs for the addition of the extension's six new station names. $150,000 was to update signs and maps on TTC vehicles and properties.

When it was named Downsview, the station was the only one in the subway system where the station name was displayed using mixed-case lettering on the platform walls. However, the new Sheppard West name is rendered in all-caps lettering using the traditional Toronto Subway typeface on placards placed on top of the former name. Smaller type appears underneath the new station name, reading "formerly Downsview", to ease with the transition.

Originally, the new Downsview Park station was to be called Sheppard West and it carried this name while under construction. The new station was located close to the entrance to Downsview Park. On the other hand, the existing Downsview station was better identified as being on Sheppard Avenue and was further away from the entrance to the park. Thus, the TTC proposed partially swapping the names of the two stations to avoid confusion, with the new station being designated "Downsview Park" and the former Downsview station being renamed "Sheppard West".

The original station name of "Downsview" was chosen because the TTC felt at the time that a more neutral name was needed in case the station became an eventual interchange with the then-proposed Sheppard Line, which was originally intended to run west of Yonge to connect with the western University–Spadina branch of Line 1 at this station. "Downsview" was chosen as a result of a public naming contest.

Architecture and art

The station was designed by Adamson Associates Architects (above grade buildings and mezzanine) and The Stevens Group Architects (below grade). The subway platform lacks pillars and the ceiling is high and curved, evoking an aircraft hangar. High ceilings, skylights and an exceptionally large mezzanine make the station feel open and airy. Natural light reaches all areas of the station including the subway platform. The offset, glassed-in access walkway above the platform overlooks it and gives passengers views of passing trains below. Originally, the walkway was divided by a sinuous barrier as it ran through both the fare-paid and unpaid areas, with the unpaid half leading from an entrance at the north end of the station to the main fare concourse. The barrier was removed after this entrance had Presto card paddle fare gates installed in 2017. As a result, the north side entrance to the station is now a fully automated entrance and is only accessible to those using Presto.

The station features two pieces of artwork:
 Sliding Pi is a large scale wall mosaic by Calgary artist Arlene Stamp. It can be viewed when travelling between the bus platform and the mezzanine level. The work shows colourful overlapping rectangles with the amount of overlap mathematically determined by the digits in the number pi. The overlapping pattern is non-repeating and gives the impression to viewers that the rectangles are sliding to one side.
 Boney Bus, created by John McKinnon in 2000, is located in front of the station and consists of an abstract bus shape made from aluminum beams with basalt "wheels".

Nearby landmarks
Nearby landmarks include Downsview Park, which was the site of the World Youth Day Papal Visit in 2002 and the SARSstock concert in 2003. It is the site of an airstrip once used by a military base (CFB Toronto), and by an aircraft manufacturer (DeHavilland), separating the station area from the original village of Downsview. William Lyon Mackenzie Collegiate Institute lies to the northeast in the Bathurst Manor neighbourhood.

Subway infrastructure in the vicinity

The subway platform is located underground east of Allen Road. There is a complex crossover just south of the station, which incorporates a switch to a single track which branches off to the west in a tunnel to access Wilson Yard. South of this point, the line partially uses what were originally the non-revenue yard access tracks north of Wilson, the previous terminal station. North of the station, the line turns sharply northwest to cross under Allen Road again, then leaves Allen Road's alignment and heads via a compound curve toward Downsview Park station. Immediately north of the station, there is a trackless third tunnel between the service tunnels, built when the station was a terminus to accommodate a potential third tail track, but which may now be used to house a potential pocket track.

Surface connections

Several TTC routes serve the station, as does one York Region Transit (YRT) route.  For YRT bus riders, disembarking is done on-street outside the station as additional fares are required when transferring between YRT and the TTC.

Proposed Line 4 extension
The original plans for Line 4 Sheppard called for it to terminate at this station (then Downsview) and connect there with Line 1, but during construction in the late 1990s, the extension of Line 4 was halted after the first phase due to funding issues. Plans to extend Line 4 are currently inactive, but some local politicians (such as former Toronto mayor Rob Ford) have tried to revive the Line 4 expansion.

References

External links

Official page on the Spadina subway extension

Art on the TTC

Line 1 Yonge–University stations
Railway stations in Canada opened in 1996
1996 establishments in Ontario